Christopher Canham (born 3 August 1962) is a British sprint canoer who competed in the early to mid-1980s. He won a bronze medal in the K-4 10000 m event at the 1981 ICF Canoe Sprint World Championships in Nottingham.

Canham also competed at the 1984 Summer Olympics in Los Angeles in the K-2 1000 m event, but was eliminated in the semifinals.

References

Sports-reference.com profile

1962 births
Canoeists at the 1984 Summer Olympics
Living people
Olympic canoeists of Great Britain
ICF Canoe Sprint World Championships medalists in kayak
British male canoeists